Dalbergia tsiandalana is a species of legume in the family Fabaceae.
It is found only in Madagascar.
It is threatened by habitat loss.

References

External links

tsiandalana
Endemic flora of Madagascar
Endangered plants
Taxonomy articles created by Polbot